Tom Hinsby (born 22 July 1945) is a Danish rower. He competed in the men's coxed four event at the 1964 Summer Olympics.

References

1945 births
Living people
Danish male rowers
Olympic rowers of Denmark
Rowers at the 1964 Summer Olympics
Sportspeople from Frederiksberg